Feeling Sexy is a 1999 Australian short feature from artist Davida Allen. Allen later described the film as:
A lovely plum pudding story. It's not out there with a big sign saying that this is the answer. But like all stories you can just get a little taste of 'we could do that'. There's hope and, as a Catholic, I feel that there is hope and I want to tell stories that say there is hope. It's a love story unlike the Hollywood stories which say move on; it's not working here so move on. Feeling Sexy is not a kind of Bible story that says, 'Drat it, this is going to be hard work'. It's just a different angle at looking at a universal situation. It's a celebration of monogamy. It's very similar to a seed which, unless it's watered, dies.

References

External links

Feeling Sexy at Oz Movies
Feeling Sexy at Australian Screen Online
"Feeling Sexy" at Urban Cinefile

Australian comedy short films
1990s English-language films
1990s Australian films